is a passenger railway station located in the city of Fuchū, Tokyo, Japan, operated by the private railway operator Keio Corporation.

Lines 
Musashinodai Station is served by the Keio Line, and is located 18.8 kilometers from the starting point of the line at Shinjuku Station.

Station layout 
This station consists of two opposed  side platforms serving two tracks,  with the station building located above and at a right angle to the tracks and platforms.

Platforms

History
The station opened on October 31, 1913. A new station building was completed in 2010.

Passenger statistics
In fiscal 2019, the station was used by an average of 26,232 passengers daily. 

The passenger figures (boarding passengers only) for previous years are as shown below.

See also
 List of railway stations in Japan

References

External links

Keio Railway Station Information 

Keio Line
Stations of Keio Corporation
Railway stations in Tokyo
Railway stations in Japan opened in 1916
Fuchū, Tokyo